David A. Zeller (June 8, 1939 – September 2, 2020) was an American professional basketball player. He played college basketball for the Miami RedHawks and played in the National Basketball Association for the Cincinnati Royals. In 61 career games, he averaged 4.6 minutes and 1.5 points per game.

Zeller died on September 2, 2020.

References

1939 births
2020 deaths
American men's basketball players
Basketball players from Ohio
Cincinnati Royals players
Cincinnati Royals draft picks
High school basketball coaches in Ohio
Miami RedHawks men's basketball players
Point guards
Sportspeople from Springfield, Ohio